North Lancaster is a neighborhood in Salem, Oregon, located in the northeast part of the city. The neighborhood is bordered on the south by Sunnyview Road, and on the west with Hawthorne Avenue. North Lancaster is home to Douglas McKay High School.

External links
City of Salem neighborhood profile

Neighborhoods in Salem, Oregon